Sehra Akram (born: 1 October 1995) is a badminton player from Pakistan.

Career

National 
Akram represents WAPDA in domestic competitions including National Championships and National Games.

2020
At the 57th National Badminton Championship held in Lahore, Pakistan, Akram competed in singles and women's doubles. In singles, she reached the semi-finals where she was beaten by her teammate, Mahoor Shahzad, the eventual champion. In doubles she paired with Huma Javeed and was beaten by Mahoor Shahzad (Wapda) and Palwasha Bashir (NBP) in 2 sets (21-9 and 21-8).

International 
Akram was part of the six member women's team which competed at the 2019 South Asian Games held in Kathmandu, Nepal.

References

Living people
1995 births
Pakistani female badminton players
South Asian Games bronze medalists for Pakistan
South Asian Games medalists in badminton